Nagaragere is a village in the southern state of Karnataka, India. It is located in the Gauribidanur taluk of Chikkaballapura district in Karnataka. It is situated 26 km away from sub-district headquarter Gauribidanur and 49 km away from district headquarter Chikkaballapura.

Demographics
According to Census 2011 information the location code or village code of Nagaragere village is 623280.  Nagaragere village is also a gram panchayat. Villages comes under Nagaragere gram Panchayat are Thayanahalli, Najaiahgarlahalli, Nagaragere, Mottavalahalli, Mallenahalli, Kamthrlahalli and Bandrahalli.

The total geographical area of village is 898.87 hectares. Nagaragere has a total population of 4,776 peoples with 2,415 males and 2,361 females. There are about 1090 houses in Nagaragere village. Hindupur is nearest town to Nagaragere which is approximately 20 km away.

Economy
Agriculture the main occupation of Nagaragere people. Since there is no direct water source available in this region, farmers are mostly dependent on rainfall. Dairy is the backbone of people's economy.

Facilities
Nagaragere has below types of facilities.

 Government higher primary School
 Government high School
 SREE Pu College (Arts and Commerce)
 Nagaragere KMF (Karnataka Milk Federation) Dairy
 Government Grocery store
 Nagaragere Gram Panchayat Office
 Government Primary hospital Hospital
 Pragathi Krishna Gramina Bank (PKGB0011201)

Temples 
 Kodilingeshwara Temple
 Kadiri Narashima Swamy
 Shree Vasavi Kanyaka Parameswari Temple
 Chowdeshwari Temple
 Nagaragere Church of Christ
 Sree Eswara Temple

References

External links
 https://chikkaballapur.nic.in/en/

Villages in Chikkaballapur district